Mind The Journey is an American psychedelic rock band  based out of Philadelphia, PA.

History
Mind The Journey as a recording project in Madison, Connecticut. After honing his craft and settling in on a sound, Mind The Journey released his first EP in early 2015. Soon after, a music video for the single "When It Happens" was released and accepted into the New Filmmakers New York Film Festival.

Following the release of his EP, MTJ moved to Boston, MA and began production on Color In The Gray Machine in his DIY recording studio. MTJ later relocated to Philadelphia, Pennsylvania, upon the release of the album.

Style
Mind The Journey has often been described as modern psychedelic rock with a sporadic, layered and genre defying Ariel Pink approach to songwriting. Music blog Et Musique Pour Tous says the sound has an, "imaginative, edgy, non-traditional and risky experimental approach to music."

In an interview with Vents Magazine, MTJ opens up on his style, "I love having very intricate and complex soundscapes with the music. This way, a listener can have multiple playbacks of each song, noticing different elements every time."

Color In The Gray Machine
Color In The Gray Machine, MTJ's first full-length album, was independently released on January 5, 2016, and mastered by Tom Waltz. It was met with mixed to positive reviews.

The song "Rose Colored Glasses" was put out as a single prior to the album's release date. The Huffington Post, covering the single early on, described the song as, "a psychedelic odyssey which takes the listener through frenetic soundscapes and ethereal melodies."

The album garnered a 3/5 star review from Scallywag Magazine and Rebel Noise. Music Existence, scoring it an 80%, says about the work, "it is an exceptionally valiant attempt at resurrecting the days of Pink Floyd and other iconic rock, although it buoys off the recent success of those of the likes of The Flaming Lips and Tame Impala"

The 12 track concept album is set in a persons dream, tackling the internal conflicts that coincide with getting older and maturing. In an interview with Louder Than War, MTJ says, "It begins with him partying, naively falling in love, and 'Dancing On The Sun.' However, once he becomes ‘lucid’, he starts seeing things the way that they really are. The love becomes more problematic, he struggles with his identity, he begins feeling the societal pressure to give in."

References

Indie rock musical groups from Connecticut
American musical duos
Musical groups established in 2005
2005 establishments in Connecticut
Indie rock musical groups from Massachusetts
Musical groups from Boston
Rock music duos